Auburn Masonic Temple may refer to

 Auburn Masonic Temple (Auburn, California), on the NRHP in California, United States
 Auburn Masonic Temple (Auburn, Washington), an historic building in Auburn, Washington, United States